Vermicularia fargoi is a species of sea snail, a marine gastropod mollusk in the family Turritellidae.

Distribution

Description 
The maximum recorded shell length is 80 mm.

Habitat 
The minimum recorded depth for this species is 0 m; maximum recorded depth is 10 m.

References

Turritellidae
Gastropods described in 1951